Fort Boggy State Park is a  state park located in Leon County, Texas between Leona and Centerville. The park was donated to the Texas Parks and Wildlife Department in 1985 by Eileen Crain Sullivan to be developed as a state park.  The park features swimming, hiking, mountain biking, canoeing, kayaking and fishing.

The park participates in the "Tackle Loaner Program"; individuals can borrow rods, reels and tackle boxes with hooks, sinkers and bobbers. Common types of fish caught include largemouth bass, channel catfish, bluegill, redear sunfish, redbreast sunfish and rainbow trout (seasonal).

The park has woodlands rolling hills, meadows, and wetlands. Large trees species include post oak, hickory, elm, sweetgum and pecan. Smaller trees and shrubs include American beautyberry, dogwood, sassafras, yaupon, hawthorn, greenbriar and Alabama supplejack. Savannah grasslands in the park are made up of little bluestem, Indiangrass, purpletop, switchgrass and the endangered Centerville brazos-mint.

Wildlife present in the park include white-tailed deer, raccoons, squirrels, foxes and beavers. Waterfowl and other varieties of aquatic wildlife reside in the park as the park is subject to flooding during rainy periods.

See also
 List of Texas state parks

References

External links

State parks of Texas
Protected areas of Texas
Leon County, Texas
1985 establishments in Texas